The Hastings class, also known as the Folkestone class, was a class of sloop which were built for the Royal Navy and the Royal Indian Navy in the interwar period.  In total five ships were built, and went on to see service in the Second World War.

Design
The Hastings were a follow on of the previous  and utilised features developed from the lessons learnt from the convoy escorts of the First World War.  They were fitted out as fleet minesweepers, but were intended to be multifunctional vessels. Features included a high, sustained forecastle to improve operations in high seas, and they were fitted with turbine machinery to improve performance. This turned out to be a drawback as the turbine machinery could not be mass-produced and the design was superseded by the Second World War in favour of classes that could be quickly brought into service.

Service
Five ships were built in total, four for the Royal Navy and one for the Royal Indian Navy. The remaining Royal Navy ships were decommissioned after the war and had all been scrapped by 1949. The sole Indian ship,  was later involved in the Royal Indian Navy Mutiny, and was subsequently transferred to the Pakistan Navy in 1948 on its formation, and was renamed Karsaz. She was broken up in 1951.

References

External links

Hastings class at Uboat.net
Sloop classes, including Hastings 
Convoy Escort Movements for Hastings-class sloops

Sloops of the Royal Navy
 
Sloop classes